Mardin is a city in southeastern Turkey.

Mardin may also refer to:

 Mardin (surname)
 Mardin mine
 Mardin Railway Station
 Mardin Airport